Christopher Cox Ashby (born 1946) served as the United States Ambassador to Uruguay.

Biography

Background and earlier life

Ashby was born in Dallas, Texas. He graduated from Georgetown University School of Foreign Service in 1968 where he was a member of the Philodemic Society, and received an M.B.A. from the University of Texas Graduate School of Business in 1970.  He also attended the MIT Sloan School of Management and Harvard Business School. 

He spent four years in the Marine Corps and served in Vietnam.

Longstanding social acquaintance of President Clinton

At Georgetown, he was Bill Clinton's roommate.

Career achievements

He worked in international banking, most notably for the Chemical Bank and Chase Manhattan Bank. He has also worked for the United Nations. He is a member of the Advisory Board of the Small Business Administration, and of the Foreign Policy Association of New York. He is married with four children.

United States Ambassador to Uruguay
He served as United States Ambassador to Uruguay under Bill Clinton and George W. Bush, from 1997 to 2001.

References

1946 births
Living people
People from Dallas
Walsh School of Foreign Service alumni
McCombs School of Business alumni
MIT Sloan School of Management alumni
Harvard Business School alumni
Ambassadors of the United States to Uruguay
Philodemic Society members